Grace Marguerite, Lady Hay Drummond-Hay (née Lethbridge, 12 September 1895 – 12 February 1946) was a British journalist, who was the first woman to travel around the world by air (in a zeppelin). Although she was not an aviator herself at first, she contributed to the glamour of aviation and general knowledge of it, by writing articles about her aerial adventures for US newspapers in the late 1920s and early 1930s.

Early life 
Grace Lethbridge was the eldest daughter of Sidney Thomas Lethbridge and his wife Grace Emily (née Willis). Her father was the managing director of the Spratt's dog and animal food company. Her father's sister was dancer Alice Lethbridge. She was married in 1920 to Sir Robert Hay Drummond-Hay (1846–1925) at the age of 25, her husband being nearly fifty years older.

Sir Robert was born in Tangiers, Morocco, and had been the British consul-general for years in Beirut, Lebanon. He  was previously married to Euphemia Katrina Willis Flemming. Four children were produced in this marriage, Arnold Robert, Edward William, Cecil, and Florence Caroline. The children were all significantly older than their new stepmother, Florence Caroline being 15 years older. After six years of marriage, Sir Robert died. Lady Drummond-Hay then was 31 years old. As a young aristocratic widow, she lived in her apartment in Finchley Road, London.

Career 

Having contributed to British papers such as The Sphere, she began to write for Hearst papers in the late 1920s. She wrote a series of articles for the Chicago Herald and Examiner, as one of the passengers aboard the first transatlantic flight of a civilian passenger zeppelin in 1928.

This airship, the LZ 127 Graf Zeppelin, was also the first to circumnavigate the world, in August 1929, taking off at Lakehurst, New Jersey and arriving there again 21 days later, after stops in Friedrichshafen, Germany, Tokyo, and Los Angeles. Captain Hugo Eckener commanded Graf Zeppelin on the flight. Drummond-Hay was the only female passenger. Among her 19 companion travellers were:
 Australian explorer Sir George Hubert Wilkins
 American multi-millionaire William B. Leeds
 Commander Charles Emery Rosendahl (USN)
 Naval observer Jack C. Richardson
 Hearst correspondent Karl von Wiegand
 Hearst photographer Robert Hartman
 Spanish newspaper correspondent Joachim Rickard
 German correspondent Heinz von Eschwege-Lichbert
 Spanish physician Geronimo Megias, the personal doctor of Spanish King Alfonso XIII.

Drummond-Hay gained fame after she arrived in New York, and her career as a journalist was secured for the next decade.

She went to war zones such as Abyssinia (Ethiopia) and was a foreign correspondent in Manchuria (China). She worked closely together for many years with her senior colleague Karl von Wiegand.  Drummond-Hay was a well-known and respected journalist of the time, known for her beauty and wit, and the intelligence and flair of her writing. Ethiopian Emperor Haile Selassie presented her with a precious jewel, which was displayed on her body at her funeral.

Last years 
During World War II, Lady Drummond-Hay and von Wiegand were interned in a Japanese camp in the Philippines. When they were set free in 1943, she was ill and Karl suffered poor eyesight after a bomb blast. They returned to the United States on the Swedish rescue ship the SS Gripsholm in December 1943. Lady Drummond-Hay died of coronary thrombosis in the Lexington Hotel on 12 February 1946. At her funeral service, many people paid their last respects, including William Randolph Hearst and Marion Davies. After she was cremated, her ashes were brought to the United Kingdom by von Wiegand.

Legacy 
Though well known in the late 1920s and early 1930s, Lady Hay Drummond-Hay has been largely forgotten. Her name is mentioned in a number of books on the history of zeppelin flights, but no major biography or other significant document has been written about her life.

An Australian documentary, The Airships: Ship Of Dreams (2004), included footage of her.

Semidocumentary Farewell
Lady Drummond-Hay's 1929 experience was explored in Vaarwel ("Farewell"), an episode of the Dutch documentary series  ("The Hour of the Wolf"), released in 2009. It was directed by Ditteke Mensink and researched by Gerard Nijssen, and told her story in semidocumentary form. The footage is of her and Graf Zeppelins round-the-world flight. Extensive newsreel footage from the time showed in some detail how an airship operated. The narration consisted mainly of readings from Lady Drummond-Hay's articles and journal, and included discussion of her relationship with von Wiegand.

Some parts of the film are fictitious; the airship's tail fin did not rip during the flight, but during a previous transatlantic flight in October 1928, nor did the airship have to land on water to do repairs.

Variety described the documentary as 'absorbing'.

Vaarwel was later broadcast in the UK, on BBC Four, as Around The World by Zeppelin, on 7 February 2010.  The English-language narration was read by Poppy Elliott.

Notes

External links 

 Lady Grace Drummond-Hay photographs and biography
  (letter is dated 8 May 1936)
 Lady Drummond-Hay's letter to Shorty Fulton, from summitmemory.org
 Lady Drummond-Hay on the Graf Zeppelin as it launches from Lakehurst, from summitmemory.org
 Photograph of Lady Drummond-Hay and Captain von Schiller on the Graf Zeppelins catwalk, from antique-images.com

British aviation pioneers
British aviators
British women journalists
1895 births
1946 deaths
Deaths from coronary thrombosis
Circumnavigators of the globe
LZ 127 Graf Zeppelin
20th-century British journalists